Robert Bartolomeu (born 3 December 1993) is a professional Czech football midfielder currently playing for FK Blansko.

He made his career league debut for Fastav Zlín on 11 August 2012 in a Czech National Football League 0–4 away loss at Olomouc. He scored his first goal in Zlín's Czech National Football League 3–0 home win against Zenit Čáslav on 7 October 2012. On 17 May 2017, he scored the winning goal in Zlín's 1–0 victory against Opava in the Czech FA Cup final, helping his club to its first major trophy in its history.

Bartolomeu is of Angolan ancestry.

Honours

Club 
Zlín
 Winner: Czech Cup 2016–17

References

External links 
 
 
 

1993 births
Living people
Sportspeople from Zlín
Czech footballers
Association football midfielders
FC Fastav Zlín players
1. SC Znojmo players
FC Zbrojovka Brno players
FK Blansko players
FC ViOn Zlaté Moravce players
Czech First League players
Slovak Super Liga players
Czech National Football League players
Czech people of Angolan descent
Czech Republic youth international footballers
Czech expatriate footballers
Czech expatriate sportspeople in Slovakia
Expatriate footballers in Slovakia